Ivan Ivanovych Yaremchuk (or Jaremczuk) (born 19 March 1962) is a Ukrainian former professional footballer who played as a midfielder.

International career
Yaremchuk earned 18 caps for the USSR national team and played in the 1986 and 1990 World Cups.

Personal life
In December 2009, he was charged with having "unnatural sex" with an underage girl. So far he is charged with one incident. He was sentenced to probation in October 2010. Allegedly he invited 13-year-old girls to his apartment and paid them 200 hryvnas (about US$25) to perform oral sex on him.

Honours
Dynamo Kyiv
 Soviet Top League: 1985, 1986, 1990
 Soviet Cup: 1985, 1987, 1990
 UEFA Cup Winners' Cup: 1985–86

References

External links
Profile 

1962 births
Living people
Sportspeople from Zakarpattia Oblast
Ukrainian footballers
Soviet footballers
Association football midfielders
Soviet Union international footballers
Soviet Top League players
Russian Premier League players
Bundesliga players
2. Bundesliga players
FC Arsenal Kyiv players
FC Dnipro Cherkasy players
FC Dynamo Kyiv players
FC Dynamo-2 Kyiv players
FC Spartak Ivano-Frankivsk players
FC Tekstilshchik Kamyshin players
FC Vorskla Poltava players
Hertha BSC players
Hapoel Rishon LeZion F.C. players
FC KAMAZ Naberezhnye Chelny players
1986 FIFA World Cup players
1990 FIFA World Cup players
Soviet expatriate footballers
Ukrainian expatriate footballers
Ukrainian expatriate sportspeople in Germany
Expatriate footballers in Germany
Ukrainian expatriate sportspeople in Russia
Expatriate footballers in Russia
Ukrainian expatriate sportspeople in Israel
Expatriate footballers in Israel
Ukrainian expatriate sportspeople in the Czech Republic
Expatriate footballers in the Czech Republic
Ukrainian expatriate sportspeople in Kazakhstan
Expatriate footballers in Kazakhstan
Recipients of the Order of Merit (Ukraine), 2nd class
Recipients of the Order of Merit (Ukraine), 3rd class